James C. Creevey (16 September 1873 – February 1967), was an Irish chess player, two-times Irish Chess Championship winner (1933, 1934).

Biography
From the mid-1920s to the end of 1930s James Creevey was one of the strongest Irish chess players. He eight times participated in Irish Chess Championships (1925, 1926, 1928, 1929, 1933, 1934, 1935, 1938) and two times won this tournament (1933, 1934).

James Creevey played for Ireland in the Chess Olympiad:
 In 1935, at second board in the 6th Chess Olympiad in Warsaw (+1, =3, -10).

References

External links

James Creevey chess games at 365chess.com

1873 births
1967 deaths
Irish chess players
Chess Olympiad competitors